George Edwards Peacock was an Australian Colonial artist. He was born in England and transported to Australia for forgery in 1837. While working as a meteorologist at South Head, Sydney, he started exhibiting paintings. The surviving landscape paintings are now considered as early documents of Colonial Sydney.

Early life 
George Edwards Peacock was born in Sedbergh, Yorkshire on 4 September 1806 and educated at Sedbergh School. He was the younger son of the vicar of Sedbergh, Rev. Daniel Mitford Peacock, and Catherine, nee Edwards; both sons were given her maiden name. Peacock was admitted as a solicitor in February 1830 and although he ran his own practice it did not fare well.  In 1836 he forged a power of attorney for transfer of stock valued at £7,814, the property of his brother, Rev. Edwards George Peacock. After appearing in court for the forgery he was sentenced to death at London's Old Bailey but the sentence was commuted to transportation for life. Before being sent to Australia Peacock spent time on board the hulk Justisa, moored in the Thames.

Peacock eventually reached Sydney aboard the Prince George on 8 May 1837. As a 'special’ or educated prisoner, he was sent to Port Macquarie where he acted as clerk to the prison barracks. There is no evidence that he painted at this time and three months after his arrival, Peacock’s wife and son joined him at Port Macquarie.
By 1839, however, his family was living in Sydney and Peacock was requesting a transfer there. By 1840 he was back in Sydney training at Paramatta Observatory with the government astronomer, James Dunlop and he was afterwards employed as a meteorologist at the South Head Weather Station. While Peacock's work was dismissed as 'unworthy of confidence' by the Colonial Astronomer, Rev. William Scott, Peacock's reports remain the only daily account of Sydney's weather between 1840 and 1856. After his marriage break-up, he moved into a nearby cottage and the views from the road to Sydney became the subject of many of his paintings. On 27 November 1847, the Sydney Chronicle announced that the Governor had granted a conditional pardon to George Peacock which enabled him to proceed to all parts of the world except England.

He appears to have been most active as a painter between 1845 and 1852 and in 1847 he exhibited with the Society for the Promotion of the Fine Arts in Australia. On 22 June 1850 Bell's Life reported on an exhibition of local works at Kern and Mader's of George Street where they were highly complimentary of a copy of an oil picture by Mr. Peacock of South Head. They also listed 'Richmond Road' and 'Buttermero Lake' as landscapes by Peacock.  In March 1851 the dealer J.T. Grocott had five of Peacock's oil views of Port Jackson on display at his gallery, together with lithographs after Peacock's painting, Citizens' Mayor's Picnic.

After the closure of the meteorological station in South Head little is known about Peacock's movements. In an article in the Sydney Morning Herald from 1857, P. G. K. says that Mr. Peacock had 'bolted from the colony' suggesting this may be the reason no later works have come to light.

Works 
Sydney from Woolloomooloo, 1849, G.E. Peacock, State Library of New South Wales ML 72
View of Lyons' Terrace Hyde Park Sydney N.S.W., 1849, G.E. Peacock, State Library of New South Wales DG 218
Port Jackson NSW distant view from above Double Bay - on the South Head Road, 1847, G. E. Peacock, State Library of New South Wales ML 237
View from Glenrock looking towards Double Bay in Port Jackson, NSW, 1846, G. E. Peacock, State Library of New South Wales ML 493
Parsley Bay, ca. 1845, G. E. Peacock,State Library of New South Wales DG 34
View from Craigend looking over Government House and Domain, 1845,  G. E. Peacock,State Library of New South Wales DL 14
Sydney from the North Shore, 1845, G. E. Peacock,State Library of New South Wales DG 313
No.4 Government House and Fort Macquarie Sydney N.S.W. from the Botanical Gardens, 1846, G. E. Peacock,State Library of New South Wales DG 336
View of the town of Parramatta from May's Hill, ca. 1840, attributed to G. E. Peacock, State Library of New South Wales ML 1226
No. 6 Port Jackson N.S.W. Woolloomooloo Lady Darling's and Point Piper Points in perspective from the Domain, 1846, G. E. Peacock, State Library of New South Wales DG 337
Supreme Court House, Sydney N.S.W., 1845, G. E. Peacock, State Library of New South Wales ML 659
Government House, ca. 1850, G. E. Peacock, State Library of New South Wales DG 206
View of Woolloomooloo from the South Head Road, 1844, G. E. Peacock, State Library of New South Wales DG 376

References

External links 
 Neville, R. (2002). George Edwards Peacock in the Picture Gallery, State Library of New South Wales, 709.94074/35

1806 births
Year of death missing
Artists from Sydney
19th-century Australian painters
19th-century English male artists
19th-century English painters
English male painters
Australian landscape painters
English emigrants to colonial Australia
Australian male painters